James Deakin (born 1929) is an American journalist and TV host.

James Deakin may also refer to:
James Henry Deakin (politician, born 1823) (1823–1880), Manchester merchant, briefly Member of Parliament for Launceston
James Henry Deakin (politician, born 1851) (1851–1881), son of the above, who replaced him as Member for Launceston
James Deakin (host) (born 1972), Filipino-British television host
Seamus Deakin (James Aubrey Deakin, 1874–1952), president of the Irish Republican Brotherhood

See also
James Deakins, fictional character in Law & Order: Criminal Intent